Selfmade Records is a German hip hop label, which was formed 2005 by Elvir Omerbegovic, better known under the pseudonym Slick One, and Philipp Dammann. The studio is located in Düsseldorf. 
Philipp Dammann left the label at the end of 2005.

History 
The label was formed 2005 in Düsseldorf. The first artist who signed was Favorite, who released 4 April 2005 the sampler Schwarzes Gold as first release over Selfmade Records. It follows the album Rappen kann tödlich sein by Favorite and Jason, which was mainly produced by Rizbo, who signed as well 2004.

Artists

Current acts

Former acts

Current producers 
Rizbo
Johnny Illstrument

Releases

Albums

References 

German record labels
Music in Düsseldorf